Frank George Mack (February 2, 1900 – July 2, 1971) was a pitcher in Major League Baseball. He played for the Chicago White Sox.

References

External links

1900 births
1971 deaths
Major League Baseball pitchers
Chicago White Sox players
Baseball players from Oklahoma
Sportspeople from Oklahoma City
Saint Mary's Gaels baseball players
Nashville Vols players